Global Society is a quarterly peer-reviewed academic journal covering international relations and globalization. It was established in 1987 as Paradigms and obtained its current name in 1996. The editor-in-chief is Rubrick Biegon (University of Kent). The journal is published by Taylor & Francis on behalf of the University of Kent.

Abstracting and indexing 
Global Society is abstracted and indexed in Scopus, EBSCOhost, International Political Science Abstracts Database, Political Science Complete, CSA Worldwide Political Science Abstracts, and PAIS International and Sociological Abstracts.

See also 

 List of globalization-related journals

References

External links 
 

Globalization-related journals
Multidisciplinary social science journals
Quarterly journals
International relations journals